Samoa (or Western Samoa until 1996) first participated at the Olympic Games in 1984, and has sent athletes to compete in every Summer Olympic Games since then. The nation has never participated in the Winter Olympic Games.

The National Olympic Committee for Samoa was created in 1983 and recognized by the International Olympic Committee that same year.

Samoa was retroactively awarded its first medal at the 2008 Games in Beijing after originally finishing fourth in the women's +75 kg category in weightlifting, as the silver and bronze medallists were stripped of their medals in 2016 for doping.

Medal tables

Medals by Summer Games

Medals by sport 
 As of the 2016 Summer Olympics

List of medalists

See also

 List of flag bearers for Samoa at the Olympics
 Samoa at the Paralympics

External links